Acanthodelphax is a genus of mostly European planthoppers belonging to the tribe Delphacini.

The genus was first described by Le Quesne in 1964.

Species
The Global Biodiversity Information Facility includes:
 Acanthodelphax denticauda (Boheman, 1847)
 Acanthodelphax spinosa (Fieber, 1866)

References

Delphacinae
Hemiptera genera
Hemiptera of Europe